Esperce is a commune in the Haute-Garonne department in southwestern France.

Geography
The commune is bordered by eight other communes, seven of them is in Haute-Garonne, and one of them is in Ariège: Lagrâce-Dieu to the north, Puydaniel and Mauressac to the northeast, Grazac to the east, Saint-Sulpice-sur-Lèze to the northwest, Gaillac-Toulza to the south, and finally by the department of Ariège to the southwest by the commune of Lézat-sur-Lèze to the southwest.

Population

See also
Communes of the Haute-Garonne department

References

Communes of Haute-Garonne